Clifton Forge Commercial Historic District is a national historic district located at Clifton Forge, Alleghany County, Virginia. The district encompasses 77 contributing buildings in the central business district of Clifton Forge.  It primarily includes frame, brick, and concrete block commercial buildings dating to the late-19th and early-20th centuries. The buildings are in a variety of popular architectural styles including Classical Revival, Mission/Spanish Revival, and Italianate. Notable buildings include the Hawkins Brothers Store (c. 1886), Wiley House (1891), Chesapeake and Ohio Office Building (1906), Masonic Theatre (1905), Alleghany Building (1905), Clifton Forge City Hall (1910-1911), U.S. Post Office (1910), Ridge Theatre (1929), the Farrar Building (1930), and the Pure Oil Company Service Station (1932).

It was added to the National Register of Historic Places in 1992, with a slight boundary increase in 2017.

See also
National Register of Historic Places listings in Alleghany County, Virginia

References

Commercial buildings on the National Register of Historic Places in Virginia
Historic districts in Alleghany County, Virginia
Neoclassical architecture in Virginia
Italianate architecture in Virginia
National Register of Historic Places in Alleghany County, Virginia
Historic districts on the National Register of Historic Places in Virginia